Behnaz Jafari (born in 1975) is an Iranian actress.

Biography 
Behnaz Jafari was born in 1975, Tehran, Iran. She is graduated in dramatic literature from Islamic Azad University. She won the Crystal Simorgh for Best Supporting Actress for her role in A House Built on Water.
Her first film in a short role was Blue Scarf in 1994.

Filmography

Film and Television 
2019 - Yalda, a Night for Forgiveness
2019 - Tehran: City of Love
2018 - 3 Faces
2017 - Wander About Me
2017 - Nafas (TV series)
2017 - The Girl's House
2016 - Ferris wheel (TV series)
2012 - The President's Cell Phone
2012 - A Respected Family
2011 - The Recall (TV series)
2011 - Havalie Otoban
2010-2011 Mokhtarnameh (TV series) as Marieh
2010 Beetle (Soosk), (short) as Marjan
2008 Zamani baraye doust dashtan
2008 - Shirin as herself
2006 The Gaze
2006 From Afar as Mehran's Wife
2005 Chand tare mu
2005 Wake Up, Arezu!
2004 Kandaloos Gardens
2003 Tehran 7:00 a.m.
2003 A House Built on Water (release year at Irani cinemas)
2002 Negin as Laleh
2001 Ab va Atash as Seema
2000 Blackboards as Halaleh
1999 Eshghe Taher
1995 The Blue Veiled

Home Video

Awards 

 Crystal Simorgh for Best Supporting Actress for her role in A House Built on Water
 Honorary diploma for Best Actress from the 30th Fajr International Film Festival for her role in The President's Cell Phone
 The best Actress from the 4th Jam-Jam TV film Festival.

References

External links

Behnaz Jaffari at Namnak

1975 births
Living people
People from Tehran
Actresses from Tehran
Iranian film actresses
People with multiple sclerosis
Islamic Azad University alumni
20th-century Iranian actresses
21st-century Iranian actresses
Place of birth missing (living people)
Crystal Simorgh for Best Supporting Actress winners